James Edwin McPherson (born January 20, 1953) is an American government official and retired United States Navy rear admiral. He served as the General Counsel of the Army from January 2, 2018 to March 24, 2020. He served as the United States Under Secretary of the Army from March 25, 2020, to January 20, 2021, and in acting capacity from July 23, 2019, to March 24, 2020. He served as Acting United States Secretary of the Navy from April 7, 2020, to May 29, 2020, following the resignation of Thomas Modly.

Education
McPherson is a native of San Diego. He graduated from San Diego State University in 1977 with an undergraduate degree in public administration. He received his Juris Doctor (J.D.) in 1981 from the University of San Diego School of Law, and in 1991, he was awarded a Master of Laws degree in Military Law from The Judge Advocate General's Legal Center and School at the University of Virginia, Charlottesville, Virginia.

Career

McPherson enlisted in the Army in 1972, and served three years as a military policeman, before leaving the Army for college. In 1979 he was commissioned as an ensign in the Judge Advocate General's Corps of the Naval Reserve. He interned in the Naval Legal Service Office (NLSO) in San Diego and then attended Naval Justice School, in Newport, R.I., completing his training in 1982. He served as a judge advocate and trial counsel at several Navy commands and ships before and after completing his graduate training in 1991. In June 1994, he reported to the staff of Commander, Submarine Force, U.S. Atlantic Fleet as the Force Judge Advocate. In December 1995, he joined the staff of the Vice Chief of Naval Operations as the Assistant for Legal and Legislative Matters. In October 1997, he became Special Counsel to the Chief of Naval Operations. In September 2000, he assumed command of Trial Service Office East, Norfolk, Va. In October 2002, he was promoted to rear admiral and assigned as the Deputy Judge Advocate General of the Navy and Commander of Naval Legal Service Command. On November 10, 2004, McPherson became the 39th Judge Advocate General of the Navy, a position he held until 2006.

McPherson has served as the executive director of the National Association of Attorneys General. He also served as the general counsel of the Department of Defense Counterintelligence Field Activity.

On October 13, 2017, President Donald Trump announced the nomination of McPherson to become the General Counsel of the United States Department of the Army. The United States Senate confirmed his nomination by voice vote on December 20. He was sworn in on January 2, 2018.

On December 5, 2019, Trump nominated him to be Under Secretary of the Army, a position that he had been holding since July 23, 2019, in an acting capacity, while concurrently serving as General Counsel of the Army. He was sworn in on March 25, 2020, after being confirmed by the Senate. Defense Secretary Mark Esper designated McPherson as Acting Secretary of the Navy on April 7, replacing Thomas Modly who resigned the same day. In relation to the 2020 coronavirus pandemic on USS Theodore Roosevelt McPherson and Chief of Naval Operations, Admiral Michael M. Gilday recommended that Brett Crozier be reinstated as the commanding officer of the Roosevelt on April 25, 2020.

Award 
McPherson is a recipient of the Navy Distinguished Service Medal, the Legion of Merit, and the Meritorious Service Medal.

Personal life
He and his wife Jennifer are married and have two adult children.

References

External links

 United States Army biography
 

|-

|-

|-

1953 births
General Counsels of the United States Army
Judge Advocates General of the United States Navy
Lawyers from San Diego
Living people
San Diego State University alumni
The Judge Advocate General's Legal Center and School alumni
Trump administration personnel
United States Army soldiers
United States Navy rear admirals (upper half)
United States Secretaries of the Navy
United States Under Secretaries of the Army
University of San Diego School of Law alumni